Namalagundu is a residential suburb of Secunderabad, India. The area is located at about 1.5 km from the Secunderabad Station. The neighbourhood surroundings of Namalagundu include Chilkalguda, Sitaphalmandi, Warasiguda and Mylargadda.

Etymology
Originally there were two huge boulders; one sitting a top of a small hill and another boulder bisecting the road towards Sithafalmandi and Mylargadda. The first boulder has completely disappeared which was behind the current Hanuman Temple and replaced by dwellings. The second boulder was where the current Lord Kalyana Venkateswara temple stands. Both these boulders had huge three vertical lines or Namalu (Telugu) and boulders are called Gundu (Telugu); hence the name Namalagundu.

Transport
A good transport facility is available to the locality. TSRTC buses – 86, 86J 139, 107J and 107V/K from Secunderabad station passes through the area.

The closest MMTS Train station is at Secunderabad and Sitaphalmandi.

Education
Schools in the locality include Nehru High School, Vedic Vidyalam High School and Amaravathi Grammar High School.

References

Neighbourhoods in Hyderabad, India